The 1966 San Jose State Spartans football team represented San Jose State College during the 1966 NCAA University Division football season.

San Jose State played as an Independent in 1966. The team was led by second-year head coach Harry Anderson, and played home games at Spartan Stadium in San Jose, California. The Spartans finished the 1966 season with a record of three wins and seven losses (3–7). Overall, the team was outscored by its opponents 151–198 for the season.

Schedule

Team players in the NFL/AFL
The following San Jose State players were selected in the 1967 NFL Draft.

The following finished their San Jose State career in 1966, were not drafted, but played in the AFL.

Notes

References

San Jose State
San Jose State Spartans football seasons
San Jose State Spartans football